Bezdědice is a village and administrative part of Hostomice in Beroun District in the Central Bohemian Region of the Czech Republic. It has about 150 inhabitants.

References

Populated places in the Beroun District
Neighbourhoods in the Czech Republic